Events from the year 1713 in Denmark.

Incumbents
 Monarch – Frederick IV
 Grand Chancellor – Christian Christophersen Sehested

Events

 13 August  Action between a gallay commanded by Løvendal and two Swedish ships of the line.

Undated

 Two separate systems are introduced with courant and species, with courant being a debased currency also used for banknote issue.
 Bank notes are issued for the first time.
 The Royal Danish Military Academy (Landkadetakademiet) is founded by request of Frederick IV on inspiration from the Naval Academy.
 The Prøvestenen Battery is established in Copenhagen.
 The County of Vallø is established by Frederick IV for Queen Anne Sophie Reventlow,

Births
 10 August  – Christian Fleischer, civil servant (died 1768)

Full date missing
 Johannes Erasmus Iversen, composer (died 1753)

Deaths
 29 March – Christian Thomsen Carl, naval officer (born 1676)

Full date unknown
 Ernst Brandenburger, master builder (year of birth unknown)

References

 
1710s in Denmark
Denmark
Years of the 18th century in Denmark